William Sean Coll (born 16 December 1929) is a former Irish footballer who played as a right winger.

Career
Coll began his career at Accrington Stanley, making 13 Football League appearances during his time at the club. After leaving Accrington, Coll signed for Sligo Rovers in 1951. Coll scored 24 League of Ireland goals for the club, before departing to sign for Ballymena United. Following his spell at Ballymena, Coll played for Doncaster Rovers, Chelmsford City, Bedford Town and Ards.

References

1929 births
Living people
Association football wingers
Republic of Ireland association footballers
People from Carrickmacross
Accrington Stanley F.C. (1891) players
Sligo Rovers F.C. players
Ballymena United F.C. players
Doncaster Rovers F.C. players
Chelmsford City F.C. players
Bedford Town F.C. players
Ards F.C. players
English Football League players
League of Ireland players
NIFL Premiership players